Ustronie may refer to the following places in Poland:
Ustronie, Lubin County in Lower Silesian Voivodeship (south-west Poland)
Ustronie, Lwówek Śląski County in Lower Silesian Voivodeship (south-west Poland)
Ustronie, Kuyavian-Pomeranian Voivodeship (north-central Poland)
Ustronie, Łódź Voivodeship (central Poland)
Ustronie, Gostyń County in Greater Poland Voivodeship (west-central Poland)
Ustronie, Leszno County in Greater Poland Voivodeship (west-central Poland)
Ustronie, Lubusz Voivodeship (west Poland)
Ustronie, Pomeranian Voivodeship (north Poland)
Ustronie, Warmian-Masurian Voivodeship (north Poland)